KAPN (107.3 FM) is a radio station licensed to Caldwell, Texas, United States. The station is currently owned by Brazos Valley Communications, Ltd.  The station's studios are located in Bryan and its transmitter is east of Caldwell.

From 1995 to 1996, the call letters for KAPN belonged to what is now KKAT, in Salt Lake City, Utah.

History
The station went on the air as KLTR on 20 December 1960. On 12 October 1989, the station changed its call sign to KHEN, and on 13 March 2007 to KHTZ. On 10 September 2008, the station changed its call letters to KULF and on 2 February 2009 to the current KAPN.

On December 2, 2010, the station changed from modern adult contemporary to oldies, branded as "Oldies 107.3".

In October 2015, KAPN shifted their format to classic hits, branded as "Classic Hits 107.3".

On February 8, 2019, KAPN added a simulcast on translator on K272FK 102.3 FM College Station, and rebranded as "Classic Hits 102.3 & 107.3".

References

External links

APN (FM)
Classic hits radio stations in the United States
Radio stations established in 1960
1960 establishments in Texas